Associação Esportiva Real, commonly known as Real, is a Brazilian football club based in São Luiz do Anauá, Roraima state. They won the Campeonato Roraimense once.

History
Real was founded on May 11, 2006, as depicted in the club's logo. After becoming a professional team in 2011, the club participated in that year's Campeonato Roraimense. They won the Campeonato Roraimense in 2011.

Achievements

 Campeonato Roraimense:
 Winners (1): 2011

Stadium
Associação Esportiva Real play their home games at Estádio Municipal de São Luiz do Anauá. The stadium has a maximum capacity of 3,000 people.

References

Football clubs in Roraima
Association football clubs established in 2006
2006 establishments in Brazil